The Australia/New Zealand Cup (ANC) is a series of cross-country skiing events arranged by the International Ski Federation (FIS). It is one of the nine FIS Cross-Country Continental Cups, a second-level competition ranked below the World Cup. The Australia/New Zealand Cup is open for competitors from all nations, but are mainly a competition for skiers from Australia and New Zealand. It is the only Continental Cup taking place in the Southern Hemisphere.

The Australia/New Zealand Cup has been held since the 2005, and has been a part of the Cross-Country Continental Cup since then.

World Cup qualification
In the end of certain periods, the overall leaders for both genders receive a place in the World Cup in the following period. The overall winners of the season receive a place in the World Cup in the beginning of the following season.

Overall winners

Men

Women

References

External links
Australia/New Zealand Cup 2019 Calendar at the International Ski Federation

Australia/New Zealand Cup
Recurring sporting events established in 2005